William Joseph Mullan (30 March 1928 – 13 November 2018) was a Scottish football referee.

Refereeing career
In 1962, Mullan became a referee in the Scottish Division One. Three years later, he was appointed as a FIFA referee.

In 1972, Mullan was selected as a referee for UEFA Euro 1972, where he officiated a semi-final match between Belgium and West Germany.

Later that year, Mullan was selected as a referee for the Summer Olympics in West Germany, where he officiated two matches, both in Munchen: Hungary - Brazil 2-2 (29 August) and F.R. Germany - German Democratic Republic 2-3 (8 September).

In 1973, Mullan retired from refereeing.

Death
Mullan died on 13 November 2018 in Edinburgh, Scotland at the age of 90.

References

External links
 Profile at worldfootball.net

1928 births
2018 deaths
People from Cardenden
Scottish football referees
UEFA Euro 1972 referees
Scottish Football League referees